is the debut single of Japanese singer Yuki Saito. The single was released by Canyon Records on February 12, 1985, and was used as an image song for Myojo Foods'  line of instant ramen. The song continues to be popular over 30 years after its debut, having been covered by multiple artists.

History
"Sotsugyō" was released on February 12, 1985 by Canyon Records, and debuted at #10 on the Oricon charts where it remained for 3 weeks before climbing as high as #6 and selling a total of 247,140 copies. It also reached #6 on The Best Ten chart. The EP single included a full-body pinup of Saito in a white dress and white sweater.

The title song was composed by Kyōhei Tsutsumi, arranged by Satoshi Takebe, with lyrics by Takashi Matsumoto. The B-side, was composed by Tsutsumi, arranged by Masataka Matsutoya, with lyrics by Matsumoto.

Chart history

Track listing

Covers
Japanese singer and actress Moeko Matsushita released a single cover version on February 14, 2002. Matsushita's single reached as high as 43 on the Oricon charts and remained on the list for 2 weeks. Later that year, tarento and gravure idol Otoha released a cover on her "OtohaCD Volume 1" album on May 22, which reached #50 on the Oricon charts and remained on the list for 1 week.

Actress and gravure idol Mizuho Hata released a single cover on February 20, 2008. It reached #179 on the Oricon charts, staying on the chart for 1 week. Donna Fiore released a cover on her album "Fiore" on September 3 that same year, though it didn't make it to the Oricon top sales chart. Manami Kurose released a cover as a B-side on her "Love Is...Shine" single on March 11, 2009. A collaboration between Rie Yamaguchi and Manzo produced a cover released on their single  on February 9, 2011, where it remained on the list for four weeks and reached #44.

The duo FEMM did a cover for their album "80s/90s J-POP REVIVAL", releasing a remix named "卒業 (Radical Hardcore Remix)", as part of the double single "卒業 / 浪漫飛行" on September 27, 2017.

Notes

References

1985 debut singles
Japanese-language songs
1985 songs
Songs with lyrics by Takashi Matsumoto (lyricist)
Songs with music by Kyōhei Tsutsumi
Yuki Saito (actress) songs